La Cabeza de Béjar is a mountainous village and [[Municipalities of Spain}municipality]] in the province of Salamanca,  western Spain, part of the autonomous community of Castile and León.

Geography

See also
List of municipalities in Salamanca

References

Municipalities in the Province of Salamanca